Lakså is an abandoned village with no road connection in a valley above Øvervatnet in the municipality of Fauske in Nordland county, Norway. There were two farms in the valley: Lakså on the shore of Lakså Bay and Nordal (or Norddal) somewhat further up the valley.

History
The Lakså farm was first mentioned in the rent-roll and census of 1665–1666, where it is referred to as Laxaaen Øegaard. Later, in 1801, several farms were mentioned in the valley: Laxaae, Nordre Laxaae, and Lieland or Laxaaenbakken. At that time there was also a farm further out along the bay called Laxaaemark, later known as Skognes. With the establishment of the municipality of Fauske  on January 1, 1905, the Lakså farm was assigned the number 93, Nordal (Lakså nordre)  was numbered 94, and Skognes (Laksåmark) was numbered 95.

Mons Petter (1807–1888), an impoverished Sami known for having found copper ore in Sulitjelma, came from the Skognes farm in Lakså.

In 1957, the Sulitjelma Line was extended to Finneid; this ended the steamship traffic on Øvervatnet, which was previously used for transport to settlements along the lake. The villages along the lake were isolated for several weeks each fall and spring, when ice formed or thawed on the water and was unsafe for travel. Without the steamships, which had created a navigable stretch of open water through the ice, it was no longer possible to travel with one's own boat. Not only Lakså, but also the smaller villages of Engan and Stifjell were eventually abandoned.

The old houses in Lakså and Nordal are used as vacation houses. A construction road was built through the valley in the 1960s as part of building the Siso Hydroelectric Power Station.

The village formerly had its own school.

References

Fauske